Darko Pešić (born 30 November 1992 in Cetinje) is a Montenegrin athlete competing in the combined events. He finished sixth in the heptathlon at the 2017 European Indoor Championships. He holds multiple national records in various events.

International competitions

Personal bests
Outdoor
100 metres – 11.25 (+1.3 m/s, Götzis 2017)
400 metres – 50.65 (Florence 2015)
1500 metres – 4:24.73 (Götzis 2017)
110 metres hurdles – 14.55 (-0.1 m/s, Sremska Mitrovica 2016) NR
High jump – 2.01 (Novi Sad 2012)
Pole vault – 4.60 (Novi Sad 2014) NR
Long jump – 7.33 (+0.4 m/s, Pitesti 2016) NR
Shot put – 15.47 (Götzis 2017)
Discus throw – 48.88 (Sremska Mitrovica 2015)
Javelin throw – 62.57 (Split 2013)
Decathlon – 7846 (Götzis 2017) NR

Indoor
60 metres – 7.19 (Belgrade 2021)
1000 metres – 2:38.23 (Belgrade 2017) NR
60 metres hurdles – 7.95 (Belgrade 2021) NR
High jump – 2.08 (Belgrade 2021) NR
Pole vault – 4.72 (Belgrade 2017) NR
Long jump – 7.24 (Belgrade 2021) NR
Shot put – 16.69 (Belgrade 2021)
Heptathlon – 6036 (Belgrade 2021) NR

References

1992 births
Living people
Montenegrin decathletes
Sportspeople from Cetinje
Athletes (track and field) at the 2015 European Games
European Games competitors for Montenegro